Petra Sitte (born 1 December 1960) is a German politician. She represents The Left. Petra Sitte has served as a member of the Bundestag from the state of Saxony-Anhalt since 2005.

Life 
Sitte was born in Dresden, Saxony. After graduating from high school in 1979, she studied economics at the Martin Luther University of Halle-Wittenberg, graduating in 1983 with a degree in economics. After subsequent research studies and work as an assistant at the Martin Luther University, she received her doctorate here in 1987. From 1990 to 2005 she was a member of the state parliament of Saxony-Anhalt. She became member of the bundestag after the 2005 German federal election. She is a member of the Digital Agenda Committee and the Committee on Education, Research and Technology Assessment. In her group she is vice-chairwoman.

References

External links 

  
 Bundestag biography 

1960 births
Living people
Members of the Bundestag for Saxony-Anhalt
Female members of the Bundestag
21st-century German women politicians
Members of the Bundestag 2021–2025
Members of the Bundestag 2017–2021
Members of the Bundestag 2013–2017
Members of the Bundestag 2009–2013
Members of the Bundestag 2005–2009
Members of the Bundestag for The Left